Pitcairnia karwinskyana is a plant species in the genus Pitcairnia. This species is endemic to Mexico.

References

karwinskyana
Flora of Mexico